Presidential elections were held in Nigeria for the first time on 11 August 1979. The result was a victory for Shehu Shagari, whose National Party of Nigeria had won the parliamentary elections in July.

Results

By state

Aftermath

Under the 1979 Nigerian Constitution, in order to be elected president on the first ballot a candidate needed to receive both the most votes nationwide and at least 25% of the vote in two-thirds of the states. However, at the time of the election, Nigeria had nineteen states, two-thirds of which in exact figures is 12.66. A dispute thus ensued over whether Shehu Shagari had received the necessary threshold by winning 25% in twelve states and 19.9% in Kano State, which Shagari claimed was two-thirds of the required 25% threshold and represented the remaining 0.66 in the constitutional threshold. Obafemi Awolowo claimed that the threshold should be rounded up to thirteen states, which Shagari had not met. The Supreme Court of Nigeria ruled in favour of Shagari.

References

Nigeria
1979 elections in Nigeria
Presidential elections in Nigeria
Election and referendum articles with incomplete results